The men's marathon at the 2008 Summer Olympics took place on 24 August at 7:30am in Beijing, ending in the Beijing National Stadium. It was (as of today) the last time in Summer Olympics history that the start and/or finish of the men's marathon route was located inside the Olympic Stadium. Ninety-five athletes from 56 nations competed. The winner of the event was Samuel Wanjiru of Kenya, who set an Olympic record in the time of two hours, six minutes, and 32 seconds. It was Kenya's first victory in the men's marathon. Morocco won its first medal in the event since 1960, with Jaouad Gharib's silver. Tsegay Kebede of Ethiopia took bronze.

Summary

It began in the early morning instead of the traditional late at night start. Through 10k, a group of 8 was at front. They were all broken down to five at 20k. At the front was Eritrean Yonas Kifle, Ethiopian Deriba Merga, Kenya's Martin Lel and Sammy Wanjiru, and Moroccan Jaouad Gharib. over the next 10k Deriba Merga started to press the pace, dropping Lel and Kifle. Just after 30k, Sammy Wanjiru attacked Deriba Merga who would crack and fade out of the medals. Sammy Wanjiru continued to sustain his gap back to Gharib. Gharib slowly reeled the deficit back but Wanjiru won the gold medal in an Olympic record 2:06:32. Gharib got silver, and Tsegaye Kebede pulled himself into third to take the bronze.

Background

This was the 26th appearance of the event, which is one of 12 athletics events to have been held at every Summer Olympics. The defending champion, Stefano Baldini of Italy, was the only returning runner from the top ten finishers in the 2004 marathon. The reigning champion (from 2007) was Luke Kibet Bowen of Kenya; he had been injured during rioting in Kenya and had not yet regained top form, but did enter as an injury replacement. Jaouad Gharib of Morocco had won the 2003 and 2005 world championships; he competed in Beijing. The favorite would have been well-established 10,000 metres runner Haile Gebrselassie of Ethiopia, who had started competing in marathons in 2005 and broken the world record at the 2007 Berlin race; Gebrselassie did not run in Beijing due to air quality concerns. The race was thus "wide open."

Eritrea, Kazakhstan, and Montenegro each made their first appearance in Olympic men's marathons. The United States made its 25th appearance, most of any nation, having missed only the boycotted 1980 Games.

Qualification

Each National Olympic Committee (NOC) was able to enter up to three entrants providing they had met the A qualifying standard (2:15:00) in the qualifying period (1 January 2007 to 23 July 2008). NOCs were also permitted to enter one athlete providing he had met the B standard (2:18:00) in the same qualifying period. The maximum number of athletes per nation had been set at 3 since the 1930 Olympic Congress.

Competition format and course

As all Olympic marathons, the competition was a single race. The marathon distance of 26 miles, 385 yards was run over a point-to-point route.

Records

Prior to this competition, the existing world and Olympic records were as follows:

Samuel Wanjiru set a new Olympic record at 2:06:32.

Schedule

All times are China Standard Time (UTC+8)

Results

Seventy-six runners finished; 19 did not.

Intermediates

s.t. - same time.

References

Notes

External links 
 Detailed Results of the Men's Marathon - The Official Website of the Beijing 2008 Olympic Games
 sports-reference

Athletics at the 2008 Summer Olympics
Marathons at the Olympics
Summer Olympics
2008 Summer Olympics
2008
Men's events at the 2008 Summer Olympics